Interbeton may refer to:

 TBG Interbeton, a cement producer in Siófok, Hungary
 Interbeton/Ham, a Dutch contractor; see J. F. Mitchell Airport